Protector, in comics, may refer to:

 Protector (DC Comics), the alias used by Jason Hart who briefly took over the role of Robin
 Protector, a number of Marvel Comics characters:
 Protector, the name used by Thoran Rul who debuted in Fantastic Four
 Protector, the name used by Gerald Marsh who debuted in Tales to Astonish
 Protector, the alias currently used by Noh-Varr
 Protector, an alternate name for Orphan-Maker used for his Generation X action figure release
 Protector, also known as Alexis the Protector, is a character who debuted in Avengers A.I.
 Protector, the name used by Isaac Ikeda who debuted in Agents of Atlas Vol. 3

See also
Protector (disambiguation)